Suguna Purushothaman (1941–25 February 2015)  was an Indian Carnatic music vocalist, composer and teacher. She was awarded the Sangeet Natak Akademi Award for Carnatic music vocals in 2010.

Suguna was born in Ponvilainthakalathur in Chengalpattu (now in Tamil Nadu) in 1941. In the 1960s, she received a Central Government scholarship and trained under Musiri Subramania Iyer, alongside students Mani Krishnasamy, Suguna Varadhachari, Padma Narayanasamy and Rukmini Ramani. She received special training under the illustrious Semmangudi Srinivasa Iyer. She also learnt layam from the mridangist Thinniyam Venkatrama Iyer, who also introduced her to Musiri.

Her layam training also enthused her to master the “Dwi Tala Avadhana” maintaining two talams of different  simultaneously in two hands while singing  that match both these talams. For her mastery in this format she was known popularly as “Pallavi Suguna”. Her contribution in reviving the practice of singing  in talams like the “Sarabanandanam” and “Simhanandanam” and the Dwitala  brought her wide acclaim.
 
Suguna trained several noted Carnatic musicians including K. Gayathri, and Srinidhi Chidambaram.

Suguna died aged 74 in Chennai, Tamil Nadu on 25 February 2015 following a long battle with cancer. According to Rajeswari Thyagarajan, a family friend and wife of Thyagarajan, the grandson of Musiri Subramania Iyer, "She wanted to listen to something in the hospital. I had, on my mobile phone, Musiri Subramania Iyer’s Nadupai in Madhyamavathi and Marivere in Shanmugapriya and her daughter played the songs for her. She opened her eyes for a second, and the end came." Her funeral was held the following day in Mandavelipakkam, and her last rites were performed at the crematorium in Besant Nagar. She was survived by her husband and two daughters. One of her daughters, Kumudha, is also a Carnatic musician.

Writer Lalitharam paid tribute to Suguma stating, "Suguna had a great flair for layam and could use her hands to keep two different thalams even as she sang. An expert in pallavi singing, she could even render simma nanthana pallavi (128 counts) in a way that appealed to a lay rasika."

Awards
 Sangeetha Choodamani (2004)
 Kalaimamani, (2006)
 Vakkeyakkarar Award, (2006) from the Madras Music Academy
 Sangeet Natak Akademi Award for Carnatic vocal music (2010)
 Vellore Gopalachariar Award (2012)

References

Further reading
 Charukesi (4 January 2011) In their gurus' footsteps - The Hindu
 Charukesi (12 March 2015) The endearing GURU - The Hindu
 (27 February 2015) Obeisance to vocalist Suguna Purushothaman - Carnatic World

1941 births
2015 deaths
Recipients of the Sangeet Natak Akademi Award